Feilai Temple is a Buddhist temple located in Dêqên County, Yunnan, China.

History
The original temple dates back to 1614, during the 17th century in the late Ming dynasty (1368–1644).

Architecture
The existing main buildings include the Zisun Hall, Guansheng Hall, Haichao Hall, wing-rooms, side rooms, and matching halls.

References

Buddhist temples in Yunnan
Buildings and structures in Dêqên Tibetan Autonomous Prefecture
17th-century establishments in China
17th-century Buddhist temples
Religious buildings and structures completed in 1614